Minavar may refer to:
 Minavar, Ardabil
 Minavar, East Azerbaijan